The 2017 ISTAF World Cup is the second edition of the ISTAF World Cup, which was conducted by the International Sepaktakraw Federation (ISTAF). The competition was originally scheduled to be held in 2015 in Goa, India. However, due to a possible clash of dates with the 2015 King's Cup Sepaktakraw World Championship and the 2015 Southeast Asian Games, the tournament was later rescheduled and moved the venue to Hyderabad with the support of the India Sports Council. The event was organised at G. M. C. Balayogi Indoor Stadium of Hyderabad, during 2–5 November 2017. Twenty-six national teams from  17 ISTAF membership countries participated, with only three countries outside Asia, named Brazil, France, and Germany. Brunei, Belgium, United Kingdom, South Korea, and the Philippines were early expected to join the competition but unfortunately absent for undisclosed reasons, while Indonesia and Pakistan national team withdrew on the first day of the event.

Thailand won first place in both men and women categories, Malaysia and Vietnam were ranked second in men's and women's events respectively. Meanwhile, the third-place of each category included two teams, India alongside Singapore in men's, and Iran together with Malaysia in women's.

Participating countries

Group stage

Group A

Group B

Group C

Group D

Group E

Group F

Group G

Group H

Final round

Men

Quarter-finals

Semi-finals

Final

Women

Quarter-finals

Semi-finals

Final

Final standings

Men category

Women category

Summary

References 

ISTAF World Cup
2017 in Indian sport